Krzeczów may refer to the following places:
Krzeczów, Bochnia County in Lesser Poland Voivodeship (south Poland)
Krzeczów, Myślenice County in Lesser Poland Voivodeship (south Poland)
Krzeczów, Łódź Voivodeship (central Poland)